Stewart Ronald Leggett (born 18 December 1944) is an Australian religious minister and former politician and educator. He was a Liberal member of the South Australian House of Assembly from 1993 to 1997, representing the seat of Hanson in the 37th Parliament of South Australia. He was deputy headmaster and pastor of Temple Christian College before entering parliament.

After not being reelected in the 1997 election, Leggett then served as a senior political advisor to the Premier and Deputy Premier of South Australia. From 1999 he was the head of the Aldinga campus of Southern Vales Christian College, until his retirement from teaching by 2005.

Early years and personal life 

Stewart Leggett was born to Colin Stewart Leggett (a furniture salesman) and Lylia Mavis Carson in Bordertown, South Australia, on 18 December 1944.

Leggett attended Bordertown High School, but missed a year of school following a car accident. He then left school early at the end of his year 10. He later moved to Adelaide and completed his year 11 and 12 at night school while working in a retail menswear store, after which he became a teacher.

Leggett's first child, Sarah Porter, was born in the 1960s followed by the birth of his second child, Paul Leggett, on 22 January 1968. Both of his children went on to become accomplished classical musicians. Sarah Porter performs cello in the Geelong Symphony Orchestra and is a recorded cellist for the 1999 Sons of Korah album Light of Life. Career highlights for Paul Leggett include performing in the opening and closing ceremonies of the 2006 Commonwealth Games and playing in many Australian orchestras, including touring China with the Royal Melbourne Philharmonic and playing principal viola for the Melbourne Opera. Paul later moved to Alice Springs to teach music to remote students. The passing of Paul Leggett at 48 years old on 13 December 2016 made national headlines after he drowned at a popular Alice Springs swimming hole while leading a local school excursion.

Teaching career 

Leggett worked as a master at Pulteney Grammar School and from 1973 until 1984 he was the Director of Drama at Pulteney Grammar. He then became a staff member at Temple Christian College soon after the school first opened in 1983. Leggett was the Deputy Headmaster of Temple Christian College from 1986 until 1993 and become the school's Acting Headmaster in 1992.

From 1999  Leggett was the headmaster of the Aldinga campus of Southern Vales Christian College until his retirement from teaching in 2005.

Ministry 

Stewart Leggett obtained his Licentiate in Theology in Melbourne in 1970 through the Australian College of Theology. He subsequently obtained his Bachelor of Ministry majoring in pastoral care.

From 1989 until 1992 Leggett was the pastor of the Lockleys Baptist Church. From 1991 until 1993 he was a minister for United Christian Fellowship. From 1993 until 1994 he became an associate pastor of the Sonshine Fellowship Church. In 1999 Leggett took up the position of Assistant Pastor of the Teen Challenge Church. In 2014 Stewart Leggett was a pastor at the Victor Harbor Church of Christ. Leggett currently sermons at Trinity South Coast, the Victor Harbor branch of Holy Trinity Church, Adelaide.

As well as leading a number of churches in Adelaide, Leggett was employed as a pastor at Temple Christian College and also as chaplain of the Norwood Football Club. In 2006 Leggett performed the funeral ceremony of the director of Teen Challenge in South Australia, Pastor Morrie Thompson. The service was attended by over 500 people, including the Hons Ann Bressington, Family First founder Andrew Evans, and Nick Xenophon who also complimented Leggett's ceremony in parliament as a matter of interest.

Political life 

Stewart Leggett had previously ran as a Liberal Movement candidate in the seat of Hawker at the 1975 federal election with a 6.6 percent primary vote, and was the fourth candidate on the Liberal Movement Senate ticket in South Australia at the 1974 federal election.

He was a Liberal member of the South Australian House of Assembly from 1993 to 1997, representing the seat of Hanson. His parliamentary appointment was to the recently created Social Development Committee where he worked with Michael Atkinson and other appointed members of parliament on an inquiry into prostitution. He also served on the Family and Community Services Committee and Tourism Committee. Leggett was a member of a 1995 Estimates Committee for the state government's $267 million South Australia Police budget.

Leggett supported upholding the ban of the controversial film Salò, or the 120 Days of Sodom. Leggett's support of the ban in parliament was quoted by Censorship in Australia:

Leggett was not reelected in the 1997 election, losing the seat for Hanson to Steph Key. The district of Hanson was abolished before the 2002 election and was replaced with Ashford.

On 21 January 2004 Crikey referenced Leggett as an unlikely powerbroker and preference negotiator behind the success of the then recently formed Family First Party. In the 29 September 2004 episode of the ABC's The Religion Report program, Family First Party cofounder Andrew Evans credited Leggett with being an early adviser to the party.

After leaving parliament Leggett then served as a senior political advisor to the Premier and Deputy Premier of South Australia. In 2003, 2006, 2009, and 2012 Leggett was appointed as a member of South Australia's Legal Practitioners Conduct Board, positions he was nominated for by the Attorney General and Premier of South Australia. In 2013 Leggett was also appointed as a Justice of the Peace, the position nominated by Premier Jay Weatherill.

Leggett ran for mayor of Victor Harbor in the 2010 council elections and was the second most popular candidate by first preference votes, but lost to Graham Philip by 108 votes.

Life after politics 

As well as continuing to minister in various churches in Adelaide, Stewart Leggett remains an active figure in city. He has worked with SAPOL Sergeants for many years delivering drivers’ safety programs in schools. Leggett is on the board of the Rotary Club of Encounter Bay, working with children as the club's Director of New Generations. He presents a radio show on 90.1 HappyFM in Victor Harbor, which includes conducting interviews with local figures in the Victor Harbor community. Leggett also remains active in many community sporting organisations following his retirement.

References

External links

 Stewart Leggett Justice of the Peace public listing.

1944 births
Living people
Liberal Party of Australia members of the Parliament of South Australia
Members of the South Australian House of Assembly
Australian educators
Australian religious leaders
20th-century Australian politicians
People from South Australia